Castlegar may refer to:
 Castlegar, British Columbia, Canada
 Castlegar Airport
 Castlegar Primary School
 Castlegar Rebels, a Junior 'B' ice hockey team
 Castlegar Apollos, a former junior 'B' ice hockey team
 Castlegar, County Galway, Ireland
 Castlegar GAA, a Gaelic Athletic Association club

See also
 Castlegard, a fictional village in Timeline